This is a list of most massive exoplanets so far discovered, arranged by decreasing Jupiter mass. The exoplanets with mass higher than 10  are included. As techniques improve, and astronomers revise their estimates, this list will change, and no mass is certain, partly because of how hard it is to discover exoplanets in the first place, and, furthermore, how much harder it is to accurately measure an exoplanet's mass.

List

See also
List of largest exoplanets
List of largest cosmic structures
List of largest galaxies
List of largest nebulae
List of largest stars

References 

Exoplanets
Most massive exoplanets
Exoplanets, Most massive
Heaviest or most massive things